Eugene David Schall (born June 5, 1970 in Abington, Pennsylvania) is a retired Major League Baseball first baseman. He played during two seasons at the major league level for the Philadelphia Phillies. He was drafted by the Phillies in the 4th round of the 1991 amateur draft.

Schall played college baseball at Villanova, earning All-Tournament honors after the 1989 Big East Conference baseball tournament.  He was named an ABCA All-American in 1991.

See also
1991 College Baseball All-America Team

References

2. "Gene Schall Statistics". The Baseball Cube. 23 January 2008.
3. "Gene Schall Statistics". Baseball-Reference. 23 January 2008.

1970 births
Living people
Villanova Wildcats baseball players
All-American college baseball players
Baseball players from Pennsylvania
Major League Baseball first basemen
Nashville Sounds players
Philadelphia Phillies players
Philadelphia Phillies scouts
Batavia Clippers players
Clearwater Phillies players
Reading Phillies players
Richmond Braves players
Scranton/Wilkes-Barre Red Barons players
Spartanburg Phillies players